Peter K. Norquest (born August 31, 1971 in Boise, Idaho) is an American linguist who specializes in Kra–Dai historical linguistics.

Education
Norquest attended the University of Arizona's Joint PhD program in Anthropology and Linguistics, where he studied under Jane H. Hill and Diana B. Archangeli. As part of his doctoral research, he participated in a Fulbright fellowship in Hainan, China from 2003 to 2004, where he collected field data on various Hlai languages such as Nadou. In 2007, he completed his doctoral dissertation on the reconstruction of Proto-Hlai.

Career
After obtaining his Ph.D. in 2007, Norquest was employed as a postdoctoral researcher under J. Stephen Lansing at the University of Arizona, where he worked on quantitative comparative-historical linguistic reconstruction methods and on the Austronesian languages of Nusa Tenggara.

From 2015 to 2016, Norquest was the principal investigator of Reconstructing Language Change and Variation, a National Science Foundation project that aims to provide a revised reconstruction of Proto-Kam–Sui.

Norquest is currently working on a reconstruction of Proto-Kra–Dai. Parts of his reconstructions have been published in Norquest (2020, 2021).

Monographs and chapters

Selected articles
Norquest, Peter (2020). A Hypothesis on the Origin of Preglottalized Sonorants in Kra-Dai. 38th West Coast Conference on Formal Linguistics. Vancouver: Department of Linguistics, University of British Columbia. 

Norquest, Peter (2005). "Word structure in Chamic: prosodic alignment versus segmental faithfulness". In Grant, A. and Sidwell, P. editors, Chamic and Beyond: Studies in mainland Austronesian languages. PL-569:147-188. Pacific Linguistics, The Australian National University. 
Norquest, Peter (1998). "Greenberg's Visit to Arizona". Mother Tongue Newsletter 31:25f.

See also
Jerold A. Edmondson
Li Fang-Kuei

References

External links
Peter Norquest on ResearchGate
Peter Norquest on Academia.edu
Reconstruction of Proto Kam-Sui by Peter Norquest, hosted at the SEAlang Library (CC BY 4.0 license)

Living people
1971 births
People from Boise, Idaho
People from Tucson, Arizona
University of Arizona alumni
Linguists from the United States
Historical linguists
Linguists of Southeast Asian languages
Linguists of Austro-Tai languages
Linguists of Kra–Dai languages
Linguists of Austronesian languages
Paleolinguists